Uvaldo Luna Martínez (born 21 December 1993) is a Mexican professional footballer who plays as a midfielder.

Personal life
Luna was born in the state of Texas in Channelview to Mexican parents. Luna has both Mexican and American nationality therefore having Dual-citizenship being able to play for either Mexico or the U.S national team.

Club career

Youth
Luna is a graduate of the Tigres UANL Youth Academy and made his senior team debut in 2013 against Cruz Azul Hidalgo in a Cup match. Uvaldo took part in the Copa Libertadores with Tigres in 2015.

Tigres UANL
Shortly after returning from the U-20 World Cup, Uvaldo made his first-team debut with Tigres in a Copa MX match against Cruz Azul Hidalgo on July 24, 2013, where Tigres lost, 1–0.

After several time in the affiliate teams Uvaldo Luna made his league debut January 17, 2015, against Club León, playing as centre forward, and was subbed out in the 28th minute of the match for Israel Jimenez.

International career

U.S & Mexico National Team

Luna has represented Mexico and the United States in several youth categories. He was part of the Mexican team that participated in the 2013 FIFA U-20 World Cup in Turkey, where he scored a goal against Mali in the final minutes of the match.

United States U-20
In early January 2012, Uvaldo Luna was called by coach Tab Ramos to the US U-20 training camp, but did not make an official debut for the team. Uvaldo Luna had also been with the US U-18 national team before in 2010.

Mexico U-20

2013 CONCACAF U20 Qualifying Tournament
In May 2012, Luna formed part of the U-20 national team under coach Sergio Almager, He played in every match and Mexico won the title.

2013 FIFA U20 World Cup
Uvaldo was part of the Mexican team that participated in the World Cup held in Turkey. Uvaldo played in all three group stage matches and scored a goal against Mali in the final minutes of the match securing Mexico a spot in the quarter-finals after a 4–1 win. Mexico would eventually be eliminated by Spain in the quarter-finals.

Mexico U-23

2015 Pan American Games
Luna participated in the 2015 Pan American games held in Toronto where he made three appearances including one in the semi-final.

2015 Toulon Tournament
Uvaldo participated in the 2013 and 2015 editions of the Toulon Tournament with Mexico.

Career statistics

Club

Honours
Tigres UANL
Liga MX: Apertura 2015
Copa MX: Clausura 2014
Copa Libertadores Runner Up: 2015

Mexico U20
CONCACAF U-20 Championship: 2013
Central American and Caribbean Games: 2014

Mexico U23
Pan American Silver Medal: 2015

References

External links
 
 
 
 Club Profile

Living people
1993 births
Mexican footballers
American soccer players
Mexico under-20 international footballers
Association football midfielders
Tigres UANL footballers
Atlas F.C. footballers
Pan American Games medalists in football
Pan American Games silver medalists for Mexico
Liga MX players
Liga Premier de México players
Tercera División de México players
Footballers at the 2015 Pan American Games
Colorado Springs Switchbacks FC players
Mexican expatriate footballers
Mexican expatriate sportspeople in Colombia
Expatriate footballers in Colombia
Patriotas Boyacá footballers
Once Caldas footballers
Unión Magdalena footballers
Categoría Primera A players
USL Championship players
American sportspeople of Mexican descent
Soccer players from Texas
People from Harris County, Texas
Medalists at the 2015 Pan American Games